Devil's Disciples is a Hong Kong television series released overseas in February 2007 and broadcast locally on TVB Jade in July 2007.

Synopsis
There are two groups of people, the good and evil. Everyone sees the Saint Sword Sect, led by Pak Tong-Ngo (Eddy Ko), as the good, and the Blood Shadow Sect, led by an unknown couple Sze Ma Shing-Wan (Michael Miu) and Mo Yung Koo-Yuet (Anne Heung), as the bad. The Saint Sword Sect tried to get rid of the Blood Shadow Sect and the Blood Shadow Sect broke apart as a result. Before they fought, Sze Ma Shing-Wan and Mo Yung Koo-Yuet had twins, which they used eagles to send them separately elsewhere for safety. After that, Pak Tong-Ngo ruled the Eight Sects.

Twenty years later, Shing Fung (Bosco Wong) and Shing Kung (Johnson Lee) are unrelated brothers. They perform on the street with their mother (Law Koon Lan) as a living. Because of a rich man's celebration for his daughter's wedding, Shing Fung joins the competition to get the lucky peach from the top of a tall scaffold. From then, he met his master (Wayne Lai) and met Pak Tong Chi-Lung (Bernice Liu). As the Saint Sword Sect is looking for new disciples, Shing Fung managed to pass all the trials and got in. He got to know Ging Lui (Kevin Cheng) and both of them became good friends. While in the Saint Sword Sect, Ging Lui looks for his mother.

The Blood Shadow Sect is revived once again, led by Mok Man (Sharon Chan) this time. Pak-Tong Ngo wants one of his disciples to learn and participate in the Big Dipper Array, which is one of the strongest and long lost martial arts in the pugilistic world. With Mok Man’s help, Ging Lui finds his mother. After he found out the truth of his mother's death, Ging Lui left the Saint Sword Sect and fell in love with Mok Man. The Sword Saint Pak-Tong Ngo found out that Shing Fung and Mok Man were siblings, so he used Shing Fung to lure Mok Man to a trap, where he would poison her. Mok Man fell into Pak-Tong Ngo's trap, but Shing Fung arrived to help her. Sword Saint Pak-Tong Ngo was outraged and made up excuses, trying to justify Mok Man's death. Ging Lui then came and taking hostage of Chi-Lung, they managed to escape, running away to meditate and heal Mok Man.

However, no matter how Szeto Shui-Ling (Shirley Yeung) tried, she could not cure Mok Man, unless they sought help from the Unity Clan, where Shui-Ling was born. Shui-Ling's father, the leader of the Unity Clan refused to cure Mok Man because there was a law which prohibited the Unity Clan from treating outsiders, as they did not want to have anything to do with the pugilistic world. So, Shui-Ling decided to marry Shing Fung. First, for the fate of his sister, Mok Man. And, secondly, for her love to Shing Fung. Shui-Ling didn't want to separate Chi-Lung. So, that night, Shui-Ling tricked Shing Fung thinking it was for power, and not wine. He drank the wine and was very drunk. Shui Ling opens her clothes and kisses Shing Fung. And, unwraps Shing Fung's clothing. Shui-Ling's parents found out in the morning and found out they had slept a night. Meanwhile, Pak-Tong Ngo has further evil plans.

Cast
 Note: Some of the characters' names are in Cantonese romanisation.

Reception
Viewers complained about the excessive heavy use of CGI graphics on the visuals to exaggerate an already exaggerated fantasy martial arts series. People felt the story had the potential to develop more as many characters were introduced, but they were never properly utilized.

They also felt the story was disorganized and the ending was anticlimactic, as the villain was never defeated, but self detonated as a result of being too powerful. Fans of Dragon Ball Z was surprised when Ging Lui (Kevin Cheng) used Goku's famous Kamehameha wave upon Pak Tong-Ngo. The epilogue of the story was followed by a small comical musical skit that was met with mixed reaction.

Viewership ratings

Awards and nominations
40th TVB Anniversary Awards (2007)
 "Best Drama"
 "Best Actor in a Leading Role" (Kevin Cheng - Ging Lui)
 "Best Actor in a Leading Role" (Bosco Wong - Sze Ma-Fung)
 "Best Actress in a Leading Role" (Sharon Chan - Sze Ma-Suet)
 "Best Actor in a Supporting Role" (Johnson Lee - Shing Kung)

References

External links
TVB.com Devil's Disciples - Official Website 
K for TVB.net Devil's Disciples - Episodic Synopsis and Screen Captures 

TVB dramas
Hong Kong wuxia television series
2007 Hong Kong television series debuts
2007 Hong Kong television series endings